Daniel Talbot is the name of:

 Daniel Talbot (film distributor), founder of New Yorker Films
 Daniel Talbot (golfer) (born 1953), Canadian golfer
 Daniel Talbot (footballer) (born 1984), English footballer
 Daniel Talbot (athlete) (born 1991), British sprinter